Yard Mountain is a mountain in the High Peaks Region of the Adirondack Park in New York. Yard Mountains elevation is  but it is not one of the High Peaks as it is too close to Big Slide Mountain.

References

Mountains of Essex County, New York
Mountains of New York (state)